Lacui Formation is a marine Miocene sedimentary formation located in Chiloé Island with minor outcrops near Carelmapu on the mainland. Gastropod shells are the most common macrofossils of Lacui Formation. According to Sernageomin (1998) the formation dates to the earliest Serravallian — that is the Middle Miocene.

South of Lacui Formation there are equivalent sedimentary rocks in the islands of Ipún, Lemo and Stoke.

See also 
 Lacuy Peninsula
 Navidad Formation
 Santo Domingo Formation

References 

Geologic formations of Chile
Neogene Chile
Serravallian
Miocene Series of South America
Laventan
Chiloé Archipelago
Geology of Los Lagos Region